Michael Boris Green  (born 22 May 1946) is a British physicist and a pioneer of string theory. He is Professor of Theoretical Physics in the School of Physics and Astronomy at Queen Mary University of London, emeritus professor in the Department of Applied Mathematics and Theoretical Physics and a Fellow of Clare Hall, Cambridge. He was Lucasian Professor of Mathematics from 2009 to 2015.

Education and background
Green was born the son of Genia Green and Absalom Green. He attended William Ellis School in London and Churchill College, Cambridge where he graduated with a Bachelor of Arts with first class honours in theoretical physics (1967) and a PhD in elementary particle theory (1970).

Career
Following his PhD, Green did postdoctoral research at Princeton University (1970–72), Cambridge and the University of Oxford. Between 1978 and 1993 he was a Lecturer and Professor at Queen Mary College, University of London, and in July 1993 he was appointed John Humphrey Plummer Professor of Theoretical Physics at the University of Cambridge. On 19 October 2009 he was confirmed as the next Lucasian Professor of Mathematics, to succeed Stephen Hawking on 1 November 2009. In 2015 was  succeeded in that chair by Michael Cates, a specialist in colloids, gels, and particulate materials.

Research
After many years in collaboration with John Henry Schwarz, he co-discovered the anomaly cancellation in type I string theory in 1984. This insight, named the Green–Schwarz mechanism, initiated the First Superstring Revolution. Green has also worked on Dirichlet boundary conditions in string theory which have led to the postulation of D-branes and instantons.

Awards and honours
Green has been awarded the Dirac and Maxwell Medals of the Institute of Physics, UK, the Dirac Medal of the International Centre for Theoretical Physics (Trieste) and the Dannie Heineman Prize for Mathematical Physics of the American Physical Society. He was elected a Fellow of the Royal Society in 1989. Green has co-authored more than 150 research papers.

His nomination for the Royal Society reads

On 12 December 2013, Michael Green shared the Breakthrough Prize in Fundamental Physics with John Henry Schwarz "for opening new perspectives on quantum gravity and the unification of forces."

Selected publications
 Green, M., John H. Schwarz, and E. Witten. Superstring Theory. Vol. 1, Introduction. Cambridge Monographs on Mathematical Physics. Cambridge, UK: Cambridge University Press, 1988. .
 Superstring Theory. Vol. 2, Loop Amplitutes, Anomalies and Phenomenology. Cambridge, UK: Cambridge University Press, 1988. .

References

External links

 
 
 
 
 

1946 births
People educated at William Ellis School
Academics of Queen Mary University of London
Alumni of Churchill College, Cambridge
English Jews
English physicists
Fellows of the Royal Society
Fellows of Churchill College, Cambridge
Fellows of Clare Hall, Cambridge
Jewish scientists
Living people
British string theorists
Lucasian Professors of Mathematics
Maxwell Medal and Prize recipients
Scientists from London
John Humphrey Plummer Professors